Uthukottai is a town in Suburbs of Chennai, one of the taluk headquarters in Thiruvallur District Tamil Nadu, also one of the border towns of Tamilnadu - Andhra Pradesh, located on the banks of the Arani river. This town is the central hub for many nearby towns and villages for their needs of education, markets, shops, businesses, banks, travel, transport and entertainment(Movie Theatres, badminton courts, cricket grounds, Gyms). The town features a channel which helps to direct water from the Krishna river for local irrigation.

The name Uthukottai is a portmanteau of two Tamil words—Uthu(Oottru), or "water Spring" and Kottai (Fort), which signifies one of the Muslim Zamindars old fort in the town.

State Highway 51 crosses Uthukottai, situated between Chennai and Tirupati.

Demography
In the 2001 India census, Uthukkottai had a population of 10,639. Males constituted 50% of the population and females 50%. Uthukkottai had an average literacy rate of 68%, higher than the national average of 59.5%: male literacy was 76%, and female literacy was 59%. In 2001 in Uthukkottai, 12% of the population was under 6 years of age.

In the 2011 census, Uthukkottai recorded 12,623 inhabitants(bilingual Tamil-Telugu). Uthukottai is again a hub for educational institutions for the nearby towns & villages,  has several schools. Of them, three are matriculation schools and rest are government and government aided school, a teacher training college, and an Arts & Science college for women at Katchur. Uthukottai is easily connected by Chennai City MTC bus. In fact, it is the shortest route to reach Tirupati.

Education

Schools in Uthukottai
Vivekanada Matriculation Higher Secondary School
Don Bosco Matriculation Higher Secondary School
Visweshwara Matriculation School
Chennai Vidyalaya Matric School
Vivekananda Vision School (CBSE)
Government Boys higher secondary school
Government Girls higher Secondary School
Kothandaraman Govt. aided School

References

Cities and towns in Tiruvallur district